Sir Compton Domvile, 2nd Baronet (1696 – 13 March 1768) was an Anglo-Irish politician. 

Domvile was the son of Sir Thomas Domvile, 1st Baronet and in 1721 he inherited his father's baronetcy. Between 1721 and 1768 Domvile was Clerk of the Crown and Hanaper in the Irish Chancery. He was the Member of Parliament for Dublin County in the Irish House of Commons from 1727 until his death in 1768. In 1743 Domvile was made a member of the Privy Council of Ireland. He inherited Santry Court from his nephew, Lord Barry of Santry, in 1751 and made unsuccessful attempts to have the barony revived in his honour. Domvile's title became extinct upon his death.

References

1696 births
1768 deaths
18th-century Anglo-Irish people
Baronets in the Baronetage of Ireland
Civil servants from Dublin (city)
Compton
Irish MPs 1727–1760
Irish MPs 1761–1768
Members of the Parliament of Ireland (pre-1801) for County Dublin constituencies
Members of the Privy Council of Ireland